The 2015 Generali Open Kitzbühel was a men's tennis tournament played on outdoor clay courts. It was the 71st edition of the Austrian Open Kitzbühel, and part of the World Tour 250 series of the 2015 ATP World Tour. It took place at the Tennis stadium Kitzbühel in Kitzbühel, Austria, from August 3 through August 8.

Singles main draw entrants

Seeds

 1 Rankings are as of July 27, 2015

Other entrants
The following players received wildcards into the singles main draw:
  Gerald Melzer
  Jürgen Melzer
  Dennis Novak

The following player received entry as a lucky loser:
  Albert Montañés

The following players received entry from the qualifying draw:
  Kenny de Schepper
  Rogério Dutra Silva
  Paul-Henri Mathieu
  Jan-Lennard Struff

Withdrawals
Before the tournament
  Pablo Andújar →replaced by Dušan Lajović
  Simone Bolelli →replaced by Albert Montañés
  Guillermo García-López →replaced by Mikhail Youzhny
  David Goffin →replaced by Aljaž Bedene
  Gilles Simon →replaced by Pablo Carreño Busta
  João Sousa →replaced by João Souza

Retirements
  Juan Mónaco

Doubles main draw entrants

Seeds

 Rankings are as of July 27, 2015

Other entrants
The following pairs received wildcards into the doubles main draw:
  Alexander Erler /  Philipp Kohlschreiber
  Fabio Fognini /  Alberto Giraudo

Finals

Singles

  Philipp Kohlschreiber defeated  Paul-Henri Mathieu, 2–6, 6–2, 6–2

Doubles

  Nicolás Almagro /  Carlos Berlocq defeated  Robin Haase /  Henri Kontinen, 5–7, 6–3, [11–9]

References

External links
Official website

Generali Open Kitzbuhel
Austrian Open Kitzbühel
Austrian Open